is an American football arcade video game developed and originally published by SNK on January 31, 1992. It was the second football game created by SNK after 1987's Touch Down Fever, as well as the only football game released for the Neo Geo platform.

In the game, players have the choice to compete in matches against either AI-controlled opponents or other human players. Despite being initially launched for the Neo Geo MVS (arcade), Football Frenzy would be later released for both Neo Geo AES (home) and Neo Geo CD in 1992 and 1994 respectively, in addition of being re-released through download services for various consoles, among other ways to play it as of date.

Football Frenzy has been met with mixed reception from critics since its initial launch, with some praising its presentation, visuals and sound design, while others criticized the gameplay for being difficult to grasp.

Gameplay 

Football Frenzy is an American football game similar to Touch Down Fever and other similar golf titles from the era, where players compete in matches against either AI-controlled opponents on a single-player tournament mode or against other human players in a two-player versus mode. Most of the rules from the sport are present in the title, following the same basic gameplay featured in other football simulators including the ability of tackling players and lob the oval-shaped football into the goalpost, though the game provides a faster pace and a more arcade-style approach of the sport instead. When playing solo, players compete against seven rival teams by choosing any of the ten selectable teams in order to become champion of the season. Due to the lack of an NFL license, all of the teams featured are fictional. If a memory card is present, the players are allowed to save their progress and resume into the last match the game saved at.

Release 
Football Frenzy was initially first launched for arcades on January 31, 1992, becoming the only football title released on Neo Geo by SNK. The game was then released for Neo Geo AES during the same time period a month later. The title was later re-released for the Neo Geo CD on September 9, 1994 as one of the launch titles for the system, with minimal changes compared to the original MVS and AES versions. It has received a re-release in recent years on various digital distribution platforms such as the PlayStation Network, Nintendo eShop and Xbox Live by HAMSTER Corporation. It was also recently included in the international version of the Neo Geo mini.

Reception 

In Japan, Game Machine listed Football Frenzy on their March 15, 1992 issue as being the fourth most-successful table arcade unit of the month, outperforming titles such as Captain Commando. The game has been met with mixed reception from critics since its initial launch.

Notes

References

External links 
 Football Frenzy at GameFAQs
 Football Frenzy at Killer List of Videogames
 Football Frenzy at MobyGames

1992 video games
ACA Neo Geo games
American football video games
Arcade video games
Multiplayer and single-player video games
Neo Geo games
Neo Geo CD games
Nintendo Switch games
PlayStation Network games
PlayStation 4 games
SNK games
Video games set in the United States
Video games developed in Japan
Xbox One games
Hamster Corporation games